Jonathan Michael Dziedzic (born February 4, 1991) is an American professional baseball pitcher who is a free agent.

Career
Dziedzic attended Atascocita High School in Humble, Texas, and Lamar University in Beaumont, Texas. He played college baseball for the Lamar Cardinals. The Boston Red Sox selected Dziedzic in the 37th round, with the 1,141st overall selection, of the 2012 MLB draft. He did not sign, returning to Lamar University. After the 2012 season, he played collegiate summer baseball with the Falmouth Commodores of the Cape Cod Baseball League.

The Kansas City Royals selected Dziedzic in the 13th round, with the 381st overall selection, of the 2013 MLB draft. He signed and spent 2013 with the Idaho Falls Chukars where he was 2–0 with a 2.68 ERA in 12 games (11 starts). He spent 2014 with the Wilmington Blue Rocks, compiling a 6–7 record and 2.52 ERA in 24 starts, and 2015 with the Northwest Arkansas Naturals, posting a 10–6 record and 3.12 ERA in 26 games (25 starts), along with pitching one game for the Omaha Storm Chasers. In 2016, Dziedzic played for Omaha, collecting a 5–10 record, 4.05 ERA, and 1.41 WHIP in 26 games, with 25 being starts, and in 2017, he returned to Omaha, starting nine games and pitching to a 3–3 record and 4.73 ERA before his season was ended due to injury. He became a free agent following the 2019 season.

References

External links

1991 births
Living people
Baseball players from Houston
Baseball pitchers
Lamar Cardinals baseball players
Falmouth Commodores players
Idaho Falls Chukars players
Wilmington Blue Rocks players
Northwest Arkansas Naturals players
Omaha Storm Chasers players